Hannes Schiel (31 May 1914 – 2 December 2017) was an Austrian actor.

Schiel was born in Vienna in 1914, and studied law at the University of Graz before becoming an actor. He began acting at a theatre in Innsbruck, then moved to Volkstheater in Vienna. From 1959 to 1979, Schiel was active in Burgtheater productions. He died in December 2017, at the age of 103.

Selected filmography
Duel with Death (1949)
The Last Ten Days (1955)
 Dunja (1955)
Fruit in the Neighbour's Garden (1956)
Vienna, City of My Dreams (1957)
The Spendthrift (1964)

References

1914 births
2017 deaths
Austrian centenarians
Men centenarians
Male actors from Vienna
University of Graz alumni
Austrian male stage actors
Austrian male film actors
20th-century Austrian male actors